John McEnroe and Mark Woodforde were the defending champions but only Woodforde competed that year with Patrick McEnroe.

McEnroe and Woodforde lost in the first round to Pieter Aldrich and Danie Visser.

Martin Davis and Tim Pawsat won in the final 7–5, 7–6 against John Fitzgerald and Anders Järryd.

Seeds

  John Fitzgerald /  Anders Järryd (final)
  Rick Leach /  Jim Pugh (semifinals)
  Patrick McEnroe /  Mark Woodforde (first round)
  Paul Annacone /  Christo van Rensburg (first round)

Draw

External links
 1989 Los Angeles Open Doubles draw

Los Angeles Open (tennis)
1989 Grand Prix (tennis)